The Latin American debt crisis was a financial crisis that originated in the early 1980s (and for some countries starting in the 1970s), often known as La Década Perdida (The Lost Decade), when Latin American countries reached a point where their foreign debt exceeded their earning power, and they were not able to repay it.

Origins

In the 1960s and 1970s, many Latin American countries, notably Brazil, Argentina, and Mexico, borrowed huge sums of money from international creditors for industrialization, especially infrastructure programs.  These countries had soaring economies at the time, so the creditors were happy to provide loans.  Initially, developing countries typically garnered loans through public routes like the World Bank. After 1973, private banks had an influx of funds from oil-rich countries which believed that sovereign debt was a safe investment. Mexico borrowed against future oil revenues with the debt valued in US dollars, so that when the price of oil collapsed, so did the Mexican economy.

Between 1975 and 1982, Latin American debt to commercial banks increased at a cumulative annual rate of 20.4 percent.  This heightened borrowing led Latin America to quadruple its external debt from US$75 billion in 1975 to more than $315 billion in 1983, or 50 percent of the region's gross domestic product (GDP).  Debt service (interest payments and the repayment of principal) grew even faster as global interest rates surged, reaching $66 billion in 1982, up from $12 billion in 1975.

History
When the world economy went into recession in the 1970s and 1980s, and oil prices skyrocketed, it created a breaking point for most countries in the region.  Developing countries found themselves in a desperate liquidity crunch.  Petroleum-exporting countries, flush with cash after the oil price increases of 1973–1980, invested their money with international banks, which "recycled" a major portion of the capital as syndicated loans to Latin American governments.  The sharp increase in oil prices caused many countries to search out more loans to cover the high prices, and even some oil-producing countries took on substantial debt for economic development, hoping that high prices would persist and allow them to pay off their debt.

As interest rates increased in the United States of America and in Europe in 1979, debt payments also increased, making it harder for borrowing countries to pay back their debts. Deterioration in the exchange rate with the US dollar meant that Latin American governments ended up owing tremendous quantities of their national currencies, as well as losing purchasing power. The contraction of world trade in 1981 caused the prices of primary resources (Latin America's largest export) to fall.

While the dangerous accumulation of foreign debt occurred over a number of years, the debt crisis began when the international capital markets became aware that Latin America would not be able to pay back its loans.  This occurred in August 1982 when Mexico's Finance Minister, Jesús Silva-Herzog, declared that Mexico would no longer be able to service its debt. Mexico stated that it could not meet its payment due dates, and announced unilaterally a moratorium of 90 days; it also requested a renegotiation of payment periods and new loans in order to fulfill its prior obligations.

In the wake of Mexico's sovereign default, most commercial banks reduced significantly or halted new lending to Latin America.  As much of Latin America's loans were short-term, a crisis ensued when their refinancing was refused.  Billions of dollars of loans that previously would have been refinanced, were now due immediately.

The banks had to somehow restructure the debts to avoid financial panic; this usually involved new loans with very strict conditions, as well as the requirement that the debtor countries accept the intervention of the International Monetary Fund (IMF). There were several stages of strategies to slow and end the crisis.  The IMF moved to restructure the payments and reduce government spending in debtor countries.  Later it and the World Bank encouraged open markets. Finally, the US and the IMF pushed for debt relief, recognizing that countries would not be able to pay back in full the large sums they owed.

However, some unorthodox economists like Stephen Kanitz attribute the debt crisis not to the high level of indebtedness nor to the disorganization of the continent's economy.  They say that the cause of the crisis was leverage limits such as US government banking regulations which forbid its banks from lending over ten times the amount of their capital, a regulation that, when the inflation eroded their lending limits, forced them to cut the access of underdeveloped countries to international savings.

Effects

The debt crisis of 1982 was the most serious of Latin America's history.  Incomes and imports dropped; economic growth stagnated; unemployment rose to high levels; and inflation reduced the buying power of the middle classes. In fact, in the ten years after 1980, real wages in urban areas actually dropped between 20 and 40 percent. Additionally, investment that might have been used to address social issues and poverty was instead being used to pay the debt. Losses to bankers in the United States were catastrophic, perhaps more than the banking industry's entire collective profits since the nation's founding in the late 1700s.

In response to the crisis, most nations abandoned their import substitution industrialization (ISI) models of economy and adopted an export-oriented industrialization strategy, usually the neoliberal strategy encouraged by the IMF, although there were exceptions such as Chile and Costa Rica, which adopted reformist strategies.  A massive process of capital outflow, particularly to the United States, served to depreciate the exchange rates, thereby raising the real interest rate.  Real GDP growth rate for the region was only 2.3 percent between 1980 and 1985, but in per capita terms Latin America experienced negative growth of almost 9 percent.  Between 1982 and 1985, Latin America paid back US$108 billion.

International Monetary Fund 
Before the crisis, Latin American countries such as Brazil and Mexico borrowed money to enhance economic stability and reduce the poverty rate. However, as their inability to pay back their foreign debts became apparent, loans ceased, stopping the flow of resources previously available for the innovations and improvements of the previous few years. This rendered several half-finished projects useless, contributing to infrastructure problems in the affected countries.

During the international recession of the 1970s, many major countries attempted to slow down and stop inflation in their countries by raising the interest rates of the money that they loaned, causing Latin America's already enormous debt to increase further. Between the years of 1970 to 1980, Latin America's debt levels increased by more than one-thousand percent.

The crisis caused the per capita income to drop and also increased poverty as the gap between the wealthy and poor increased dramatically. Due to the plummeting employment rate, children and young adults were forced into the drug trade, prostitution and terrorism. The low employment rate also worsened many problems like homicides and crime and made the affected countries undesirable places to live. Frantically trying to solve these problems, debtor countries felt pressured to constantly pay back the money that they owed, which made it hard to rebuild an economy already in ruins.

Latin American countries, unable to pay their debts, turned to the IMF (International Monetary Fund), which provided money for loans and unpaid debts. In return, the IMF forced Latin America to make reforms that would favor free-market capitalism, further aggravating inequalities and poverty conditions. The IMF also forced Latin America to implement austerity plans and programs that lowered total spending in an effort to recover from the debt crisis.  This reduction in government spending further deteriorated social fractures in the economy and halted industrialisation efforts.

Latin America's growth rate fell dramatically due to government austerity plans that restricted further spending. Living standards also fell alongside the growth rate, which caused intense anger from the people towards the IMF, a symbol of "outsider" power over Latin America. Government leaders and officials were ridiculed and some even discharged due to involvement and defending of the IMF.  In the late 1980s, Brazilian officials planned a debt negotiation meeting where they decided to "never again sign agreements with the IMF". The result of IMF intervention caused greater financial deepening (Financialization) and dependence on the developed world capital flows, as well as increased exposure to international volatility. The application of structural adjustment programs entailed high social costs in terms of rising unemployment and underemployment, falling real wages and incomes, and increased poverty.

2015 levels of external debt
The following is a list of external debt for Latin America based on a 2015 report by The World Factbook.

See also 
 Chilean crisis of 1982
 1998–2002 Argentine great depression
 South American economic crisis of 2002
 Latin American economy
 List of sovereign debt crises
 Odious debt

References

Further reading

 Signoriello, Vincent J. (1991), Commercial Loan Practices and Operations, Chapter 8 Servicing Foreign Debt, Latin American Debt Crisis, Performing a Vital Service, .
 Signoriello, Vincent J. (1985, Jan–Feb) International Correspondent Banker Magazine, London, England, Performing a Vital Service, The Future for Debt Rescheduling, pp. 44–45.
 Sunkel, Osvald and Stephany Griffith-Jones (1986), Debt and Development Crises in Latin America: The End of an Illusion, Oxford University Press.

External links
 Latin American Debt Crisis: Effects on Mexico from the Dean Peter Krogh Foreign Affairs Digital Archives
 International Monetary Fund

1970s economic history
1980s economic history
Economic history of Mexico
Financial crises
History of government debt
Latin American history
Economy of Central America
Economy of South America
Economy of the Caribbean
1970s in South America
1980s in South America
1970s in Central America
1980s in Central America